Benis Belesi (born 1 June 1999) is a Belgian professional footballer who plays for Jong FC Utrecht, as a defender.

References

1999 births
Living people
Belgian footballers
Jong FC Utrecht players
Eerste Divisie players
Association football defenders
Belgian expatriate footballers
Belgian expatriate sportspeople in the Netherlands
Expatriate footballers in the Netherlands
S.C. Eendracht Aalst players
S.V. Zulte Waregem players
Nike Academy players
Expatriate footballers in England
Belgian expatriate sportspeople in England